Woma may refer to:

Bernard Woma (1966-2018), Ghanaian musician and gyile player
Woma python (Aspidites ramsayi), also known as Ramsay's python and sand python, a species of snake endemic to Australia
WomaNews, radical feminist newspaper
WOMA, earlier call sign of the radio station WBDK
WOMA-LP, earlier call sign of the radio station WLEB-LP